Mohammad Rami Radwan Martini (born 1970) is a Syrian engineer and politician. He has served as Minister of Tourism since 2018.

Early life and education
Martini was born in Aleppo, and is a Syrian civil engineer, where he obtained a BA in Civil Engineering - specialization in project management from Aleppo University, and he is married and has 3 children.

Career
Previously, he held the position of deputy minister of tourism between April 2014 and November 2018. 

Martini headed the first official Syrian delegation to Riyadh after the official relations between the two countries were severed after the Syrian crisis in 2011.

Sanctions
In March 2019 Martini included in the European Union's sanctions against Syria due to the violent repression of civilians in the country since 2011.

References 

Living people
1970 births
21st-century Syrian politicians
University of Aleppo alumni
Syrian ministers of tourism
Syrian civil engineers